eMagin Corporation is an American electronic components manufacturer based in Hopewell Junction, New York. eMagin specializes in organic light emitting diode (OLED) technology and manufactures micro OLED display used in virtual imaging products and other related products. 

Since the company's founding in 1996 it has developed and manufactured products for other various markets, including medical, law enforcement, remote presence, industrial, computer interface, gaming and entertainment. For its microdisplays being incorporated in various military equipment such as night vision goggle and head-mounted display systems, the company has been a contractor to the U.S military.

Recognition

In 2000, eMagin Corporation was named the winner of 2000 SID Information Display Magazine Display of the Year Gold Award, for technological advancement in the development of the organic light emitting diode (OLED) microdisplay technology, referred to as OLED-on-silicon.

References

External links
Official Website
3DVisor

Companies established in 1996
Companies listed on NYSE American
Display technology companies
Information technology companies of the United States
Companies based in Bellevue, Washington